Gwangju Metro is the rapid transit system of Gwangju, South Korea, operated by the Gwangju Metropolitan Rapid Transit Corporation (GRTC, or Gwangju Metro). The subway network first opened in 2004 with 14 stations. It crosses both of the major rivers in Gwangju, the Yeongsan River and the Hwangryong River. Most of the system is underground, except for the sections between Sotae-Nokdong and Pyeongdong-Dosan.

History
 Apr 28, 2004 : Line 1 partially opened ( Nokdong ↔ Sangmu )
 Apr 11, 2008 : Line 1 fully opened ( Nokdong ↔ Pyeongdong )

Lines

Line 1

As of 2021 Line 1 consists of twenty stations. Most trains run between Pyeongdong and Sotae, with about one train per hour continuing towards Nokdong.

Line 2
Line 2 of the subway is under construction as of 2021. It is scheduled to open in three phases between 2023 and 2025.

Expansions and plans

Plan to extend Line 1
The Gwangju City Government has a plan to extend the current Line 1 eastward to Hwasun and westward to Naju. In 2009, the Presidential Committee on Balanced National Development promised to include the Line 1 extension in its '5+2 extensive economic zone' project.

Planned lines

Line 2 was originally planned as a circle line, but the Gwangju City Government also considered a 'South-North type' as well. After the results of a public hearing conducted in 2019 construction started as originally planned, with the first section of the line being scheduled to open in 2023. Phases 2 and 3 are scheduled to open in 2024 and 2025, respectively.

Network Map

See also
Transport in South Korea
List of metro systems

References

External links

 

 
Metro
Underground rapid transit in South Korea
Railway services introduced in 2004